Shibatayama Stable (Japanese: 芝田山部屋, Shibatayama-beya) is a stable of sumo wrestlers, one of the Nishonoseki group of stables. It was founded in 1999 by former yokozuna Ōnokuni. Located in Suginami, it is the only stable to be situated in the western half of Tokyo as of 2020.

Mongolian born  became the stable's first wrestler to earn promotion to the jūryō division, in March 2008, but he only lasted one tournament in the division and left sumo in acrimonious circumstances in 2010, claiming in a lawsuit that was eventually settled out of court that he had been forced to retire against his will. In February 2013 the stable absorbed its parent Hanaregoma stable due to the imminent retirement of its stablemaster, former ōzeki Kaiketsu. Among the wrestlers transferring was another Mongolian, who was ranked in jūryō for five tournaments between January 2014 and January 2015. In January 2020 returned to jūryō after 30 tournaments away.

In March 2016 Shibatayama and wrestler Komanokuni were ordered by the Tokyo District Court to pay 32.4 million yen (287,500 USD) in compensation to a former wrestler who the court ruled had faced "daily abuse" since joining in 2008 and had to undergo four surgeries for a detached retina, eventually losing sight in the eye in 2013. Shibatayama appealed the ruling, and in November 2016 a court-mediated, confidential settlement was reached. As of January 2023, it had nine wrestlers.

The stable is unusual in that its training dohyō is located in the basement.

Ring name conventions
Many wrestlers at this stable take ring names or shikona that include either the character 大 (read: ō or dai) or 国 (read: kuni), in deference to their coach and the stable's owner, the former Ōnokuni whose shikona included both characters.

Owner
1999–present: 12th Shibatayama (riji, the 62nd yokozuna, Ōnokuni)

Notable active wrestlers
None

Notable past wrestlers

 (best rank jūryō)
 (best rank jūryō)
Daishōchi (best rank Makushita)

Coach
Minezaki (consultant, former maegashira Misugiiso)

Assistant
Hananokuni (wakaimonogashira, former maegashira, real name Akihiro Noguchi)

Referee
Kimura Ginjirō (makuuchi gyōji, real name Noriyuki Itoi)
Kimura Kichijirō (jūryō gyōji, real name Masahiro Nishino)

Ushers
Katsuyuki (san'yaku yobidashi, real name Katsuyuki Koyama)
Keisukei (juryo yobidashi, real name Daisuke Nakano)

Hairdresser
Tokokado (1st class tokoyama'')

Location and access
Tokyo, Suginami, Takaido 2-26-9
2 minute walk from Takaido Station on the Inokashira Line

See also 
List of sumo stables
List of active sumo wrestlers
List of past sumo wrestlers
Glossary of sumo terms

References

External links 
Japan Sumo Association profile
Official Site

Active sumo stables